The Amaryllidaceae are a family of herbaceous, mainly perennial and bulbous (rarely rhizomatous) flowering plants in the monocot order Asparagales. The family takes its name from the genus Amaryllis and is commonly known as the amaryllis family. The leaves are usually linear, and the flowers are usually bisexual and symmetrical, arranged in umbels on the stem. The petals and sepals are undifferentiated as tepals, which may be fused at the base into a floral tube. Some also display a corona. Allyl sulfide compounds produce the characteristic odour of the onion subfamily (Allioideae).

The family, which was originally created in 1805, now contains about 1600 species, divided into about 70–75 genera, 17 tribes and three subfamilies, the Agapanthoideae (agapanthus), Allioideae (onions and chives) and Amaryllidoideae (amaryllis, daffodils, snowdrops). Over time, it has seen much reorganisation and at various times was combined with the related Liliaceae. Since 2009, a very broad view has prevailed based on phylogenetics, and including a number of other former families.

The family is found in tropical to subtropical areas of the world and includes many ornamental garden plants and vegetables.

Description 

The Amaryllidaceae are mainly terrestrial (rarely aquatic) flowering plants that are herbaceous or succulent geophytes (occasionally epiphytes) that are perennial, with the exception of four species. Most genera grow from bulbs, but a few such as  Agapanthus, Clivia and Scadoxus develop from rhizomes (underground stems).

The leaves are simple rather fleshy and two-ranked with parallel veins. Leaf shape may be linear, strap like, oblong, elliptic, lanceolate (lance shaped) or filiform (threadlike). The leaves which are either grouped at the base or arranged alternatively on the stem may be sessile or petiolate and possess a meristem.

The flowers, which are hermaphroditic (bisexual), are actinomorphic (radially symmetrical), rarely zygomorphic, pedicellate or sessile, and are typically arranged in umbels at the apex of leafless flowering stems, or scapes and associated with a filiform (thread like) bract. The perianth (perigonium) consists of six undifferentiated tepals arranged in two whorls of three. The tepals are similar in shape and size, and may be free from each other or fused at the base (connate) to form a floral tube (hypanthium). In some genera, such as Narcissus, this may be surmounted by cup or trumpet shaped projection, the corona (paraperigonium or false corolla). This may be reduced to a mere disc in some species.

The position of the ovary varies by subfamily, the Agapanthoideae and Allioideae have superior ovaries, while the Amaryllidoideae have inferior ovaries. The six stamens are arranged in two whorls of three, occasionally more as in Gethyllis (Amaryllidoideae, 9–18).

The fruit is dry and capsule-shaped, or fleshy and berry-like.

The Allioideae produce allyl sulfide compounds which give them their characteristic smell.

Taxonomy

History

Pre-Darwinian 

Linnaeus described the type genus Amaryllis, from which the family derives its name, in his Species Plantarum in 1753, with nine species, in the Hexandria monogynia (i.e. six stamens and one pistil) containing 51 genera in all in his sexual classification scheme. The name Amaryllis had been applied to a number of plants over the course of history.

Hexandria monogynia has come to be treated as either liliaceous or amaryllidaceaeous (see Taxonomy of Liliaceae) over time.  From 1763, when Michel Adanson conceived of these genera as 'Liliaceae' it was included in this family, placing Amaryllis in Section VII, Narcissi. of his scheme, in which the Liliaceae had eight sections.

With de Jussieu came the formal establishment of organising genera into families (ordo) in 1789. De Jussieu established the hierarchical system of taxonomy (phylogeny), placing Amaryllis and 15 related genera within a division of monocotyledons, a class (III) of Stamina Perigynia and 'order' Narcisse, divided into three subfamilies. This system also formally described the Liliaceae, which were a separate order within the Stamina perigynia (Lilia). The use of the term Ordo (order) at that time was closer to what we now understand as family, rather than order. In creating his scheme, De Jussieu  used a modified form of Linnaeus' sexual classification, but with the respective topography of stamens to carpels rather than just their numbers.

The family Amaryllidaceae was formally named as 'Amaryllidées' (Amaryllideae) in 1805, by Jean Henri Jaume Saint-Hilaire. In 1810 Brown proposed that a subgroup of Liliaceae be distinguished on the basis of the position of their ovaries (inferior) and be referred to as Amaryllideae and in 1813 de Candolle described Liliacées Juss. and Amaryllidées Brown as two quite separate families. The literature on the organisation of genera into families and higher ranks became available in the English language with Samuel Frederick Gray's A natural arrangement of British plants (1821). Gray used a combination of Linnaeus' sexual classification and Jussieu's natural classification to group together a number of families having in common six equal stamens, a single style and a perianth that was simple and petaloid, but did not use formal names for these higher ranks. Within the grouping, he separated families by the characteristics of their fruit and seed. He treated groups of genera with these characteristics as separate families, such as Amaryllideae, Liliaceae, Asphodeleae, and Asparageae.

John Lindley (1830, 1846) was the other important British taxonomist of the early 19th century. In his first taxonomic work, An Introduction to the Natural System of Botany (1830) he partly followed De Jussieu  by describing a subclass he called 'Endogenae, or Monocotyledonous Plants' (preserving de Candolle's Endogenæ phanerogamæ) divided into two tribes, the Petaloidea and Glumaceae. He divided the former, often referred to as petaloid monocots, into 32 orders, including the Amaryllideae.  He defined the latter as "Hexapetaloideous bulbous hexandrous monocotyledons, with an inferior ovarium, a six-parted perianthium with equitant sepals, and flat, spongy seeds" and included  Amaryllis, Phycella, Nerine, Vallota, and Calostemma.

By 1846, in his final scheme Lindley had greatly expanded and refined the treatment of the monocots, introducing both an intermediate ranking (Alliances) and tribes within families. Lindley placed the Liliaceae within the Liliales, but saw it as a paraphyletic ("catch-all") family, being all Liliales not included in the other orders, but hoped that the future would reveal some characteristic that would group them better. This kept the Liliaceae separate from the Amaryllidaceae (Narcissales Alliance). Of these Liliaceae was divided into eleven tribes (with 133 genera) and Amaryllidaceae into four tribes (with 68 genera), yet both contained many genera that would eventually segregate to each other's contemporary orders (Liliales and Asparagales respectively). The Liliaceae would be reduced to a small 'core' represented by the tribe Tulipeae (18 genera), while large groups such Scilleae and Asparagae would become part of Asparagales either as part of the Amaryllidaceae or as separate families. While of the four tribes of the Amaryllidaceae, the Amaryllideae and Narcissea would remain as core amaryllids while the Agaveae would be part of Asparagaceae, but the Alstroemeriae would become a family within the Liliales.  
 
Since then, seven of Linnaeus' Hexandria monogynia genera have consistently been placed in a common taxonomic unit of amaryllids, based on the inferior position of the ovaries (whether this be as an order, suborder, family, subfamily, tribe or section). Thus, much of what we now consider Amaryllidaceae remained in Liliaceae because the ovary was superior, till 1926 when John Hutchinson transferred them to Amaryllidaceae. This usage of the family entered the English language literature through the work of Samuel Frederick Gray (1821), William Herbert (1837) and John Lindley (1830, 1846). Meanwhile, Lindley had described two Chilean genera which for which he created a new family, Gilliesieae.

The number of known genera within these families continued to grow, and by the time of the Bentham and Hooker classification (1883), the Amaryllidaceae (Amaryllideae) were divided into four tribes, of which only one (Amarylleae) is still included. The Liliaceae were becoming one of the largest families, and Bentham and Hooker divided it into 20 tribes, of which one was the Allieae, which as Allioideae would eventually become part of Amaryllidaceae as two of its three subfamilies. The Allieae included both Agapantheae, the third of the current subfamilies, and Lindley's Gilliesieae as two of its four subtribes. Bentham and Hooker's scheme was the last major classification using the natural approach.

Post-Darwinian 
Although Charles Darwin's Origin of Species (1859) preceded Bentham and Hooker's publication, the latter project was commenced much earlier and Bentham was initially sceptical of Darwinism. The new phyletic approach changed the way that taxonomists considered plant classification, incorporating evolutionary information into their schemata. The major works in the late 19th and early 20th centuries employing this approach were German, those of Eichler (1875–1886), Engler, Prantl (1886–1924), and Wettstein (1901–1935).

The Amaryllidaceae  were treated similarly in the German-language literature to the manner they had been in English. August Eichler (1886) was the first phyletic taxonomist and positioned the Amaryllidaceae and Liliaceae within the Liliiflorae, one of the seven orders of monocotyledons. Liliaceae included both Allium and Ornithogalum (modern Allioideae). Adolf Engler developed Eichler's ideas much further, into much more elaborate schemes that evolved over time, from his 1888 scheme, contributed by Pax to his 1903 version In the latter, the Liliineae were a suborder of Liliiflorae, including both families Liliaceae and Amaryllidaceae. Within the Liliaceae, the core liliids were segregated in subfamily Lilioideae from the alliaceous subfamily, Allioideae. Allieae, Agapantheae, and Gilliesieae were the three tribes within this subfamily. A somewhat similar approach to Liliiflorae was adopted by Wettstein (without suborders or tribes), and with Alliodeae (Allium) and Lilioideae (Ornithogalum) as subfamilies of Liliaceae. Wettstein's Amaryllidaceae contained three subfamilies., including Amaryllidoideae and Agavoideae.

The early 20th century was marked by increasing doubts about the placement of the alliaceous genera within Liliaceae. Lotsy was the first taxonomist to propose separating them, and in his system he describes Agapanthaceae, Alliaceae, and Gilliesiaceae as new and separate families from Liliaceae. This approach was adopted by a number of other authorities, such as Dahlgren (1985) and Rahn (1998).

Another approach was that of John Hutchinson (1926), who performed the first major recircumscription of the family in over a century. He doubted Brown's dictum that the position of the ovary was the distinguishing feature that separated Amaryllidaceae and Liliaceae. He treated Amaryllidaceae as bulbous plants with umbellate inflorescences, the latter characteristic being the defining feature: "an umbellate inflorescence subtended by an involucre of one or more spathaceous bracts". His work on this has been upheld by subsequent research and his definition remains valid today. Using this criterion, he removed a number of taxa (Agavaceae, Hypoxidaceae, Alstroemeriaceae) and transferred the Agapantheae, Allieae, and Gilliesieae from Liliaceae to Amaryllidaceae.

Other writers proposed reuniting Amaryllidaceae with Liliaceae. Thorne (1976) and Cronquist (1988) both included Amaryllidaceae within a broad concept of Liliaceae (although Thorne  later separated them again, but keep Alliaceae as a third family). Thus 'Alliaceae' were variously included in either Liliaceae, Amaryllidaceae, or as a separate entity. This uncertainty of circumscription reflected a wider problem with the petaloid monocots in general. Over the course of time, widely differing views as to the limits of the family have been expressed, so much of the literature dealing with this family requires careful inspection to determine which sense of the Amaryllidaceae the work treats.

Phylogenetic era 
The current phylogenetic era of understanding the taxonomic relationships of Amaryllidaceae began with the work of Fay and Chase (1996) who used the plastid gene rubisco rbcL to identify the close relationship between Agapanthus, Alliaceae, and Amaryllidaceae. Agapanthus had variously been included in Alliaceae or was placed in a separate family, Agapanthaceae. They relocated Agapanthus within Amaryllidaceae as they considered it a sister group to that family. Nevertheless, the Angiosperm Phylogeny Group (APG) classification (1998) still considered these three separate families within Asparagales. The close relationship was confirmed in a more detailed study by Meerow (1999) who confirmed the monophyly of Amaryllidaceae, with Agapanthaceae as its sister family and Alliaceae in turn as sister to the Amaryllidaceae/Agapanthaceae clade.

In its second iteration (2003), the APG proposed simplifying the higher (core) Asparagales by reducing them to two more broadly circumscribed families, and provisionally proposed the name Alliaceae sensu lato (s.l.) to include the three sister families (Agapanthaceae, Alliaceae sensu stricto, s.s., and Amaryllidaceae), since together they form a monophyletic group. In this respect, they were following Hutchinson's system (see above). Under this proposal, the three families became reduced to subfamilies (and by extension the subfamilies of Alliaceae s.s. being reduced to tribes.) At the same time, they appreciated an argument existed for making Amaryllidaceae s.l. the formal name of the new and larger family, a position subsequently strongly supported by Meerow and colleagues.

The 2009 version of the APG formally adopted this broad view and the conserved name Amaryllidaceae. To distinguish this broader family from the older, narrower family, it has become customary to refer to Amaryllidaceae sensu APG, or as used by APG, Amaryllidaceae s.l.. as opposed to Amaryllidaceae s.s..

This phylogenetic tree (cladogram) shows the placement of Amaryllidaceae s.l. within the order Asparagales.

Subdivision 

As reconstituted by the APG, Amaryllidaceae s.l. consists of three subfamilies, Agapanthoideae, Allioideae, and Amaryllidoideae, corresponding to the three families that were subsumed into it:
 Agapanthoideae (Agapanthaceae)
 Allioideae (Alliaceae)
 Amaryllidoideae (Amaryllidaceae s.s.)

Of these, one (Agapanthoideae) is monogeneric for Agapanthus (see Cladogram I).

Of the other two subfamilies, Allioideae was resolved into three subdivisions by the initial phylogenetic studies of Fay and Chase (1996). Since they treated Allioideae as family Alliaceae, these were subfamilies Allioideae, Tulbaghioideae, and Gilliesioideae. When family Alliaceae was reduced to subfamily Allioideae, they were reduced to tribes, namely Allieae, Tulbaghieae and Gilliesieae (see Cladogram II).

Complete resolution of infrafamilial (suprageneric) relationships within subfamily Amaryllidoideae (Amaryllidaceae s.s.) has proven more difficult. Fay and Chase's study lacked sufficient resolution for further elucidation of this group. Historically a wide variety of infrafamilial classification systems have been proposed for the Amaryllidaceae. In the latter twentieth century there were at least six schemes, including Hutchinson (1926), Traub (1963), Dahlgren (1985), Müller-Doblies and Müller-Doblies (1996), Hickey and King (1997) and Meerow and Snijman (1998). Hutchinson was an early proponent of the larger Amaryllidaceae, transferring taxa from Liliaceae and had three tribes, Agapantheae, Allieae and Gilliesieae. Traub (who provides a brief history of the family) largely followed Hutchinson, but with four subfamilies (Allioideae, Hemerocalloideae, Ixiolirioideae and Amaryllidoideae), the Amaryllidoideae he then divided further into two "infrafamilies", Amarylloidinae and Pancratioidinae, an arrangement with 23 tribes in total. In Dahlgren's system, a "splitter" who favoured larger numbers of smaller families, he adopted a narrower circumscription than Traub, using only the latter's Amaryllidoideae which he treated as eight tribes. Müller-Doblies described ten tribes (and 19 subtribes). Hickey and King described ten tribes by which the family were divided, such as the Zephyrantheae. Meerow and Snijder considered thirteen tribes, one (Amaryllideae) with two subtribes (For a comparison of these schemes see Meerow et al. 1999, Table I).

The further application of molecular phylogenetics produced a complex picture that only partially related to the tribal structure considered up to that date, which had been based on morphology alone. RAther Amaryllidaceae resolved along biogeographical lines. A predominantly South African clade identified as Amaryllideae was a sister group to the rest of the family. The two other African tribes were Haemantheae and Cyrtantheae, and an Australasian tribe Calostemmateae was also identified, but a large clade could only be described as Eurasian and American, each of which were monophyletic sister clades to each other. The Eurasian clade was poorly resolved with the exception of  Lycorideae (Central and East Asian). The American clade was better resolved identifying both Hippeastreae as a tribe (and Zephyranthinae as a subtribe within it). The American clade also included an Andean clade

Further investigation of the American clade suggested the presence of two groups, the Andean clade and a further "Hippeastroid" clade, in which Griffineae was sister to the rest of the clade (Hippeastreae). Similarly within the Andean clade Eustephieae appeared as sister to the remaining clade, including Hymenocallideae. A new tribe, Clinantheae was also identified in this group.

The Eurasian clade was also further resolved (for historical treatment, see Table I Meerow et al. 2006) into four tribes, Pancratieae, Narcisseae, Galantheae and Lycorideae. This positioned Lycorideae as sister to the remaining Mediterranean tribes.

These relationships are summarised in the following cladogram:

Angiosperm Phylogeny Group 

Publication of the third version of the APG classification and acceptance of Amaryllidaceae s.l. was accompanied by a listing of accepted subfamily and tribal names, since the change in rank from family to subfamily necessitated a revision of other lower ranks, as follows:

Family: Amaryllidaceae J.St.-Hil., Expos. Fam. Nat. 1: 134. Feb–Apr 1805, nom. cons.
 Subfamily: Agapanthoideae Endl., Gen. Pl.: 141. Dec 1836.
 Subfamily: Allioideae Herb., Amaryllidaceae: 48. late Apr 1837.  
 Tribe Allieae Dumort., Fl. Belg.: 139. 1827. (1 genus)
 Tribe Gilliesieae Baker, J. Linn. Soc., Bot. 14: 509. 24 Apr 1875. (18 genera)
 Tribe Tulbaghieae  Endl. ex Meisn., Pl. Vasc. Gen.: Tab. Diagn. 397, 399, Comm. 302. 17–20 Dec 1842. (2 genera)
 Subfamily: Amaryllidoideae Burnett, Outl. Bot.: 446. Feb 1835 (15 tribes)
 Tribe Amaryllideae Dumort., Anal. Fam. Pl.: 58. 1829. 
 Tribe Calostemmateae D.Müll.-Doblies & U.Müll.Doblies, Feddes Repert. 107 (Short commun.): 7 Dec 1996.
 Tribe Cyrtantheae Traub, Herbertia 5: 111. Nov 1938.
 Tribe Eucharideae Hutch., Fam.Fl.Pl.2:130.20 Jul 1934.
 Tribe Eustephieae Hutch., Fam.Fl.Pl.2:130.20 Jul 1934.
 Tribe Galantheae Parl., Fl. Ital. 3: 75. 1858.
 Tribe Gethyllideae Dumort., Anal. Fam. Pl.: 58. 1829.
 Tribe Haemantheae Hutch., Fam. Fl. Pl. 2: 130. 20 Jul 1934.
 Tribe Hippeastreae  Herb. ex Sweet, Brit. Fl. Gard., ser. 2, 1: ad t. 14. 1 Sep 1829. 
 Tribe Hymenocallideae Small, Man. S.E. Fl.: 315. 30 Nov 1933.
 Tribe Lycorideae Traub ex D.Müll.-Doblies & U.Müll.Doblies, Feddes Repert. 107 (Short commun.): 6. Dec. 1996.
 Tribe Narcisseae Lam. & DC., Syn. Pl. Fl. Gall.: 165. 30 Jun 1806. 
 Tribe Pancratieae Dumort., Anal. Fam. Pl.: 58. 1829. 
 Tribe Stenomesseae Traub, Pl. Life 19: 60. Jan 1963

This circumscription differs from the phylogenetic descriptions of Meerow and colleagues in several respects. Griffineae is recognised as a distinct tribe within the Hippeastroid clade, and Stenomesseae is recognised as polyphyletic with two distinct types based on leaf shape (lorate-leafed and petiolate-leafed). The lorate-leafed species of the type genus of Stenomesseae, Stemomesson, were transferred to a new tribe, Clinantheae as sister to Hymenocallideae in the Andean clade. The remnants of Stemomesson then formed a distinct clade with Eucharis (Eucharidae) and Eucharidae renamed as Stenomesseae (see Cladogram III).

 Tribe Griffineae Ravenna
 Tribe Clinantheae Meerow

Genera 
The Angiosperm Phylogeny Website lists 73 genera and 1,605 species within Amaryllidaceae s.l., while The Plant List (2013) gives 80 genera and 2,258 species.

Distribution 
Amaryllidaceae are a cosmopolitan family, whose distribution is pantropical to subtropical, but infrafamilial relationships are related to geographical considerations. The tribe Amaryllideae is primarily South African, and Haemantheae and Cyrtantheae are also African, while the Calostemmateae are Australasian. Other elements are Eurasian and American, including an Andean subclade without necessarily following strictly tribal delimitations. This leads to discussions of, for instance American Amaryllidaceae. The Eurasian clade includes Lycorideae. The American clade includes the Hippeastreae, Eustephieae and Zephyranthinae.

Cultivation and uses 
The Amaryllidaceae include many ornamental garden plants such as daffodils, snowdrops and snowflake, pot plants such as amaryllis and Clivia, and vegetables, such as onions, chives, leeks and garlic. A number of tropical lily-like plants are also sold, such as the belladonna lily, Amazon lily, blood lily (Cape tulip), Cornish lily (Nerine), and the Eurasian winter daffodil, Sternbergia.

Their economic importance lies in floriculture for cut flowers and bulbs, and commercial vegetable production.

References

Bibliography

Books

Historical 
  see also Species Plantarum
 
 Table of 58 families, Part II: Page 1
 Table of 1615 genera, Part II: Page 8

Modern 

 
 
  Volume 1: Monocotyledonae 1926, Volume 2: Dicotyledonae 1934.

 
 
 
 
 
 
 Chapter 2. Alan Meerow. Taxonomy and Phylogeny. pp. 17–55 
  see Enciclopedia Argentina de Agricultura y Jardinería
 
 
 
 , in 
 , in 
 , in

Symposia 

 
  Excerpts

Articles and theses 

 
 
  
  Full text
 
 
 
 
 
 
  Full text

APG system

Pharmacology

Websites

Databases

External links 
 
 
 Amaryllidaceae J.St.-Hil. at the Amaryllidaceae project, e-monocot.org
 Amaryllidaceae in BoDD – Botanical Dermatology Database

 
Asparagales families